Hiroto Kumagai is a Japanese politician who is a member of the House of Councillors of Japan.  He represents the Saitama at-large district.

Biography 
He was born on March 23, 1962 and graduated from Chuo University. Afterwards, he joined LOTTERIA Co., Ltd., a chain of fast-food restaurant for a year. He later joined the Policy Secretary to Kazuhito Wada and Mie Ishida. In 2007, he was a member of the Saitama City Assembly for three terms. In 2019, he was elected to the House of Councillors.

References 

Chuo University alumni
Living people
1962 births
Members of the House of Councillors (Japan)